Stephens Island or Stephen Island may refer to:

 Stephens Island (New Zealand), also known as Takapourewa
 Stephens Island (Torres Strait), Queensland, Australia, also known as Ugar
 Stephens Island (Great Barrier Reef), Queensland, Australia
 Stephens Island (British Columbia), Canada
 Stephens Island (Nunavut), Canada
 Stephen Island, Antarctica